Kenya competed at the 2013 World Championships in Athletics from August 10 to August 18 in Moscow, Russia.

Medalists
The following competitors from Kenya won medals at the Championships

Team selection
Kenya sends a team consisting of 49 athletes to Moscow.  Notably missing from the squad is defending 800 metres champion and world record holder David Rudisha.

Women

References

External links
IAAF World Championships – Kenya

Nations at the 2013 World Championships in Athletics
World Championships in Athletics
Kenya at the World Championships in Athletics